Haiti and Jamaica have bilateral relations. Both nations have honorary consulates in their respective capitals.

Since Haiti's independence in 1804, Jamaica has been a frequent destination for exiled former Haitian leaders and politicians, starting with the 3rd president, Charles Rivière-Hérard.

In January, 2007, Haitian President René Préval made a four-day working visit to Jamaica. At a press conference, Jamaican Prime Minister Portia Simpson Miller announced that a Joint Jamaica/Haiti Commission would be convened later that year.

The two countries share a maritime boundary.

References

 
Jamaica
Bilateral relations of Jamaica